Lake Blalock (formally, the H. Taylor Blalock Reservoir) is a reservoir in Spartanburg County, South Carolina, located on the Pacolet River about five miles north of Spartanburg. After its creation was authorized in 1976 by the Commissioners of Spartanburg Water System, Blalock Dam was constructed in 1983.

The existing spillway was also upgraded by furnishing and installing three hydraulically operated spillway crest gates, constructing a new cast-in-place concrete ogee crest, and constructing a bridge across the spillway. In addition, the project also cleared approximately 300 acres (42 miles of shoreline) around the perimeter of the reservoir.

See also
List of lakes in South Carolina

References

External links
 Spartanburg Water System
 Lake Blalock Dam image during construction (Google)

Blalock
Lake Blalock
Protected areas of Spartanburg County, South Carolina
Bodies of water of Spartanburg County, South Carolina